Duque de Caxias ("Luís Alves de Lima e Silva, Duke of Caxias") is a bairro in the District of Sede in the municipality of Santa Maria, in the Brazilian state of Rio Grande do Sul. It is located in centre-west Santa Maria.

Villages 
The bairro contains the following villages: Duque de Caxias, Parque Residencial Duque de Caxias, Vila Lameira, Vila Moreira, Vila Plátano.

Gallery of photos

References 

Bairros of Santa Maria, Rio Grande do Sul